The Bahamas competed at the 1968 Summer Olympics in Mexico City, Mexico.

Athletics

Men
Track & road events

Field events

Sailing

Open

Wrestling

Men's freestyle

See also
Bahamas at the 1967 Pan American Games

References
Official Olympic Reports
Part Three: Results
sports-reference

Nations at the 1968 Summer Olympics
1968
Olympics